Wizernes is a commune in the Pas-de-Calais department, northern France. The commune is twinned with Ensdorf, Germany.

Population

History
The village was named "Weserinium" in 844 and was damaged by the Allies of World War II during Operation Crossbow bombings of the German V-weapon bunker complex known as La Coupole.

Places of interest
 The church of St. Folquin, dating from the twentieth century.

References

Communes of Pas-de-Calais